Tom Steele (15 November 1905 – 28 May 1979) was a Scottish Labour politician.

Steele worked as a station master and served on the board of the Lanark Co-operative Society.

Steele was elected as Member of Parliament for the constituency of Lanark in 1945, defeating future Prime Minister Lord Dunglass (Alec Douglas-Home), and served as Parliamentary Secretary at the Ministry of National Insurance.

He lost this seat back to Douglas-Home in 1950, but was elected for Dunbartonshire West at a by-election later that year.  He held this seat until he retired in 1970, to be replaced by Ian Campbell.

At elections his campaign sometimes used the slogan Vote Steele For Strength.

External links 
 
 Scottish Politics – Candidates and Constituency Assessments: Clydesdale
 Scottish Politics – Smallest majorities at Westminster
 West Dunbartonshire Labour Newsfile (PDF File) at epolitix.com

1905 births
1979 deaths
Scottish Labour MPs
Transport Salaried Staffs' Association-sponsored MPs
UK MPs 1945–1950
UK MPs 1950–1951
UK MPs 1951–1955
UK MPs 1955–1959
UK MPs 1959–1964
UK MPs 1964–1966
UK MPs 1966–1970
Ministers in the Attlee governments, 1945–1951